Franchise Tax Board of California v. Hyatt (short: Hyatt I), 538 U.S. 488 (2003), was a United States Supreme Court case in which the Court unanimously held that the Full Faith and Credit Clause does not require Nevada state courts to give full faith and credit to California statutes that immunize its tax agencies from suit. It was followed by Hyatt II in 2016 and Hyatt III in 2019, ultimately overturning precedent set by the 1979 Supreme Court case, Nevada v. Hall.

References

External links
 

United States Supreme Court cases
United States Supreme Court cases of the Roberts Court
2003 in United States case law